Barripper is a village in west Cornwall, England, United Kingdom, approximately one mile south-west of Camborne . The village has a public house named the St Michael's Mount Inn, so called as an outbuilding on that site was a resting place for druids and saints. Having landed at Godrevy, they followed a riverside trail from there through Roseworthy and Penponds to Barripper, where they were housed for the night, before continuing their pilgrimage to St Michaels Mount.

References

External links

Villages in Cornwall